Chiloscyphus is a genus of liverworts belonging to the family Lophocoleaceae.

The genus has cosmopolitan distribution. In 2010 John J. Engel published a monograph on the Australasian species in this genus.

Selected species 
 Chiloscyphus acutus Steph. 
 Chiloscyphus alpicola J.J.Engel

References

Jungermanniales
Jungermanniales genera